Joseph Orbeli (Hovsep Abgari Orbeli; , Iosif Abgarovich Orbeli; 20 March (O.S. 8 March) 1887 – 2 February 1961) was a Soviet-Armenian orientalist, public figure and academician who specialized in medieval history of Transcaucasia and administered the Hermitage Museum in Leningrad from 1934 to 1951. Of Armenian descent, he was the founder and first president of the Armenian National Academy of Sciences (1943–47).

Biography

Early life and education
Born into the Orbelian Dynasty in Kutaisi, Russian Georgia in 1887, Joseph Orbeli completed his secondary education at a classical gymnasium in Tbilisi. In 1904, he was accepted to Saint Petersburg University. He studied history and philology (with a particular emphasis in Latin and Greek) and graduated from the university in 1911.

During his student years, Orbeli accompanied his professor, Nikolai Marr, to Russian Armenia, where he took part in excavations of the ruins of the medieval Armenian capital of Ani. Marr pushed his pupil to fully immerse himself in the fields of archaeology, literature, lithography and linguistics; otherwise, Marr reasoned, he would find himself unprepared in his research and his studies.

Archaeological studies
Following his graduation, Orbeli departed for Armenia once more. He became the director of an on-site museum that was established at Ani and, during Marr's absences, frequently headed the excavations himself. He also traveled to Nagorno-Karabakh (more precisely, to the historical region of the Principality of Khachen), gathering and categorizing lithographic material. Orbeli also managed to travel to Western Armenia, where he was able to study Armenian, Seljuq, and Urartian monuments and conduct research on Armenian and Kurdish dialects.

Gradually, Orbeli was emerging as the leading authority on Armenian antiquities in the world. In 1912, he became a member of the Imperial Russian Archaeological Society and in 1914, he began teaching Armenian and Kurdish studies at Saint Petersburg University. In 1916, he participated in a Russian archaeological expedition around the Lake Van region; it was here where he discovered an inscription attributed to the Urartian king Sarduri II.

He continued his work at Saint Petersburg University; in 1917, he was appointed an assistant professor of Armenian-Georgian studies, but occasionally taught at Moscow's Lazarev Institute of Oriental Languages as well.

Academic work
In the years leading up to the Russian Revolution, Orbeli published a number of books, including a catalogue of artifacts found at Ani and a series of studies dealing with classical philology, Armenian history, archaeology and art. This led to his appointment to the Hermitage Museum in July 1934, which he would steer through the hardships of Joseph Stalin's purges.

In December 1941, the deadliest month of the Siege of Leningrad, Orbeli led a festival dedicated to Ali-Shir Nava'i, a medieval Turkic poet and philosopher. Orbeli considerably enhanced the museum's holdings of Oriental art, making it one of the top Oriental art museums in the world. No less important was Orbeli's role as head of the national school of Caucasus studies. Orbeli underscored the importance of linguistic studies for proper understanding of historical processes.

In 1934, as a member of the Soviet delegation, he went to Iran for the Ferdowsi millennial celebrations and visited the cities of Tehran and Mashhad. A year later he organised the 3rd International Congress of Iranian Art and Archeology at the Hermitage Museum and the accompanying exhibition therein. The other spiritus movens of the congress was Arthur Upham Pope.

In 1955–60, he was in charge of the Faculty of Oriental Studies at the renamed Leningrad University.

Later life
He was buried at Bogoslovskoe Cemetery in Leningrad. He was featured in the movie Russian Ark as the director of the Hermitage.

In stamps

References

Select bibliography
 Избранные Труды [Selected works]. Yerevan: Armenian Academy of Sciences, 1963.
 "Akademik Iosif Abgarovich Orbeli: (biograficheskiy ocherk" [The academician Joseph Abgarovich Orbeli: a biographical essay], pp. [5]-12 in: Strube V. V. (red). Issledovaniia po istorii kul'tury narodov Bostoka: sbornik v chest' akademika I. A. Orbeli. Moskva Leningrad. Izdatel'stvo Akademiii Nauk SSSR, 1960, 527 p.

Further reading

 Yuzbashyan, Karen. Ակադեմիկոս Հովսեփ Աբգարի Օրբելի [Academician Hovsep Abgari Orbeli] Yerevan: Armenian Academy of Sciences, 1987.

1887 births
1961 deaths
Ethnic Armenian historians
People from Kutaisi
Soviet Armenians
Soviet orientalists
Directors of the Hermitage Museum
Full Members of the USSR Academy of Sciences
Soviet historians
Soviet archaeologists
Joseph
Recipients of the Order of Lenin
Medievalists
Historians of Armenia
Armenian orientalists
Burials at Bogoslovskoe Cemetery
20th-century archaeologists